Blera notata , the Ornate Wood Fly, is a rare  species of syrphid fly first officially described by Weidemann in 1830. Hoverflies get their names from the ability to remain nearly motionless while in flight. The  adults, also known as flower flies for they are commonly found around and on flowers from which they get both energy-giving nectar and protein rich pollen. The larvae are of the  rat-tailed type, feeding on exuding sap or in the rot holes of trees.

Distribution
United States.

References

Eristalinae
Insects described in 1830
Diptera of North America
Hoverflies of North America
Taxa named by Christian Rudolph Wilhelm Wiedemann